César Eduardo Rodríguez Huamani (born 21 September 1967) is a retired Peruvian international footballer.

Playing career

Club
Rodríguez played for Deportivo Municipal, Alianza Lima and Universitario.

International
Rodríguez made 16 appearances, scoring 3 goals, for the Peru national football team from 1989 to 1991. He participated in the 1981 and 1991 Copa América.

References

External links

1967 births
Living people
Association football midfielders
Peruvian footballers
Peru international footballers
1989 Copa América players
1991 Copa América players
Peruvian Primera División players
Deportivo Municipal footballers
Club Alianza Lima footballers
Club Universitario de Deportes footballers
Place of birth missing (living people)